Vonoprazan/amoxicillin, sold under the brand name Voquezna Dual Pak among others, is a co-packaged medication used for the treatment of Helicobacter pylori (H. pylori) infection. It contains vonoprazan (as the fumarate), a potassium-competitive acid blocker and amoxicillin, a beta-lactam antibiotic. It is taken by mouth.

The co-packaged medication was approved for medical use in the United States in May 2022.

Medical uses 
Vonoprazan/amoxicillin is indicated for the treatment of H. pylori infection in adults.

Research 
The dual therapy of using vonoprazan with amoxicillin has been investigated for the treatment of H. pylori infection and also compared with the triple therapy of using vonoprazan, amoxicillin, and clarithromycin for the eradication of H. pylori infection. Both treatments have been found to be effective.

References

External links 
 
 

Combination drugs
Drugs acting on the gastrointestinal system and metabolism
Proton-pump inhibitors